Świebodzin is a town in western Poland with 21,736 inhabitants (2019). It is the capital of Świebodzin County. Since the Local Government Reorganization Act of 1998, Świebodzin has been part of Lubusz Voivodeship. It was formerly part of the Zielona Góra Voivodeship (1975–1998).

Świebodzin is an important transportation hub, lying at the crossroads of the Polish national roads 2 and 3. The crowned statue of Christ in Świebodzin, completed in November 2010, is one of the world's tallest statues of Jesus.

History

Middle Ages

The town's name derives from the Polish personal name Świeboda, related to swoboda meaning "freedom". The area was part of Poland since the creation of the state in the 10th century. As a result of the fragmentation of Poland, it initially was part of Greater Poland, and later it was part of Silesia. The earliest historical records which mention Sebusianis, Sipusius Silesius, Suebosian, Soebosian, Suebusianus for today's Świebodzin date from the beginning of the 14th century, when the area belonged to the Lower Silesian Polish-ruled Duchy of Głogów. The town sprang up at the intersection of the old trade routes linking Silesia with Pomerania and a branch of the route running from Lusatia to Poznań in Greater Poland and further to Pomerelia. Initially, the town was probably a defensive fortification, built on the western banks of Lake Zamecko at a slight elevation. The town wall was ringed by settlements, which were much later incorporated into the city itself.

In 1319 the Brandenburg margrave Waldemar of Ascania conquered Świebodzin and the town of Sulechów to its south. He died in the same year and the territory fell back to the Silesian Piasts, who in 1329 became vassals of Bohemia, an Electorate of the Holy Roman Empire. When in 1476 Duke Henry XI of Głogów died without issue, fights over his succession broke out between Duke Jan II the Mad of Żagań and the Brandenburg Elector Albert III Achilles of Hohenzollern, who in ca.1479 was able to acquire the northern part of the duchy with the towns of Crossen (Krosno Odrzańskie) and Züllichau (Sulechów), which were incorporated into the Neumark district of Brandenburg in 1537. The area of Świebodzin however remained a Bohemian fief, becoming an exclave of the Silesian crown land which in 1526 passed with the Bohemian Kingdom to the Habsburg monarchy.

Early modern period

Because of the town's location at an important crossroads, it developed economically, particularly in the areas of commerce and craft production. In the 15th century and particularly in the 16th century, Schwiebus was known for manufacturing beer and exporting cloth. It also developed various urban handicrafts and manufactured goods for local purposes (the weekly market). The salt, wool, grain, horse, and beef trades were also important.
For a time the Schwiebus territory was granted by the emperor to Brandenburg-Prussia. Representatives of well-known Silesian families, including the von Knobelsdorffs, among others, held authority and power in the town as district starosts and castle commanders on behalf of the Habsburgs.

Because of its position near the Holy Roman Empire's border with the Kingdom of Poland, the town most likely had a population of mixed Polish and German descent at this time, but Germans were the majority by the early modern period. During the 16th and the first half of the 17th centuries, the town expanded economically, spatially, and demographically, in spite of local conflicts and the turbulent Protestant Reformation and Counter-Reformation.

After the victory of King Frederick II of Prussia in the First Silesian War (1740–1742), Schwiebus came under Prussian administration. In 1817 its territory was merged with the southern Züllichau region to form the Züllichau-Schwiebus District in the Province of Brandenburg. Schwiebus remained in this territorial form until 1945. Annexation by Prussia brought about a sharp economic crisis, as the tradesmen of Schwiebus were cut off from many of their traditional markets and outlets. The Prussian authorities also increased local taxes while limiting the town's autonomy. The period of revolutions and Napoleonic wars brought about a depression in the cloth trade and limited the economic prospects of the town.

The town's extended stagnation ended with the Stein-Hardenberg economic reforms and the beginning of the industrial revolution in the mid-19th century. As a medium-sized town and hub of the local market, lying at the intersection of several routes of communication, including the new Frankfurt (Oder)-Poznań railway line, Schwiebus became a center of local industry (textile, machinery, and agricultural food processing). The town was modernized at this time with improved traffic arteries, renovation of the town hall, reconstruction of the church of St. Michael, and the construction of several new public service buildings (law courts, high school, gas works, and post office). Schwiebus contributed to and benefited from the economic expansion of the German Empire in the years before 1914.

20th century

A new period of economic stagnation began with the territorial changes in central Europe after Germany's defeat in World War I. In the interwar period, Schwiebus found itself in the eastern outskirts of Germany, twenty kilometers west of the newly imposed German-Polish border. During the 1920s, Weimar Germany experienced two major economic crises, the hyperinflation of the early 1920s and the Great Depression beginning in 1929. The citizens of Schwiebus suffered severe economic hardship during this time. As was the case elsewhere in Germany, many of the town's citizens were dissatisfied with their lot and turned to political extremism.

Adolf Hitler of the Nazi Party came to power in Germany in 1933. Hitler quickly moved to consolidate and expand his power, adopting severe repressive measures against his political opposition and the German Jewish minority. However, Hitler remained popular with the public because he oversaw the German economic recovery of the 1930s. The new government sponsored many public works programs and a massive rearmament campaign which included the construction of an extensive fortified line of bunkers, Ostwall (today known as the Międzyrzecz Fortified Region) twenty kilometers north of Schwiebus.

World War II (1939–45) first brought hardship to Schwiebus and then total disaster. In early January 1945, the Soviet Red Army began its final advance through Poland into eastern Germany, reaching Schwiebus before the end of the month. By this time, many of its inhabitants had already fled, fearing the Soviet revenge for the atrocities perpetrated by the German occupation forces against the civilian population of the Soviet Union. The town was largely spared from destruction during the fighting, as the bulk of the Soviet forces passed to the north and south on their way to Berlin. It was finally captured on 31 January 1945. The capture was not without casualties.

After Germany's defeat in the war, Schwiebus became Świebodzin, and was once again part of Poland.

The new Polish government adopted the communist economic system and enacted sweeping social, economic, and political reforms.  Świebodzin's economic recovery was also hampered by the Soviet policy of dismantling industrial facilities in conquered areas, and shipping components back to the Soviet Union. In this way, Świebodzin lost some of its prewar industries, particularly its breweries.

Świebodzin expanded in the period under communist rule, and its population doubled. New neighborhoods were built to the south of the railway line, composed largely of pre-fabricated apartment buildings. The Communist Economic Planning Commissions chose to develop the electromechanical, furniture, and timber industries in Świebodzin. Products were exported throughout Poland and to the other states in the Soviet Bloc.

However, with the collapse of the Soviet Bloc and the revolutions of 1989, Świebodzin once again experienced economic upheaval. With some difficulties, the local economy was adapted to the international market economy. New industries and businesses were established, but others were unable to compete in the new environment and went bankrupt. Many more goods became available in local shops, but at prices that many inhabitants could not afford. In recent years, a few foreign-owned discount supermarkets, pizzerias, hotels, and other businesses have been established in the town, taking advantage of the proximity of Poland's main east–west motorway. With the economic changes there have also been political changes. A series of non-communist local governments have been elected since 1989.

Attractions and sites of interest

The center of Świebodzin still contains remnants of the town's past as a medieval walled settlement, including two nearly intact towers and fragments of the town's defensive walls and bastions. The central market square is dominated by the town hall, built around 1550 in the renaissance style and rebuilt in the 19th century with the addition of its prominent clock tower. The town hall still contains its original gothic vaults in the rooms of the Regional Museum and basement cafe. There are two large churches in the town center, the Church of St. Michael the Archangel and the Church of the Mother of God. The Church of St. Michael was first built in the second half of the 15th Century, and its neo-gothic façade was added in the second half of the 19th century. The neo-gothic Church of the Mother of God was built during the Imperial German period as a Protestant Church but was reconsecrated as a Catholic Church after World War II.

In the summer of 2008, assembly of the Christ the King, a giant statue of a crowned Jesus Christ, began on a hill on the outskirts of the town. Intended to serve as a future site of pilgrimage, the statue was completed in November 2010, and is claimed to be the world's largest statue of Jesus, although if the crown is excluded the Cristo de la Concordia in Bolivia is still taller. Construction was funded by donations from local people and as far away as Canada. The existence of the statue has seen fellow Poles referring to the town jokingly as Rio de Świebodzineiro.

Sport
Świebodzin has a table tennis club KS Jofrakuda Świebodzin which is playing in 3.liga (Polish third division). The club has also the other teams playing in lower divisions of Lubusz. The club is known from a successful work with young table tennis players, who are highly ranked in Polish youth categories.

Notable people

Martin Agricola (1486–1556), composer
Ruth Margarete Roellig (1878–1969), writer
Otto Feige (B. Traven) (ca. 1882 – ca. 1969), writer of The Treasure of the Sierra Madre
Werner Kolhörster (1887–1946), physicist
Walter Warzecha (1891–1956), admiral and last commander of the Kriegsmarine
 (1898–1945), artist
Selli Engler (1899-1972), German writer and leading activist of the lesbian movement in Berlin
Karl-Heinz Bendert (1914–1983), Luftwaffe ace  
Wolfhart Westendorf (1924–2018), egyptologist
Michael Witzel (born 1943), Wales Professor of Sanskrit at Harvard University
Zdzisław Hoffmann  (born 1959), first ever triple jump World Champion (1983)
Piotr Rysiukiewicz (born 1974), sprinter

Twin towns – sister cities
See twin towns of Gmina Świebodzin.

References

External links
Official website 
Historical artifacts from Świebodzin/Schwiebus 
Regionalny Portal Informacyjny 
Jewish Community in Świebodzin on Virtual Shtetl
GAZETA Świebodzińska 
Gazeta Lokalna. Dwutygodnik Powiatu Świebodzińskiego
Oficjalna strona KS Jofrakudy Świebodzin / Official website of the table-tennis club KS Jofrakuda 

Cities and towns in Lubusz Voivodeship
Świebodzin County